Kai Sjøberg (29 April 1936 – 15 September 1994) was a Norwegian football striker. He mainly played for Skeid, becoming league champion in 1966 and cup champion in 1963 and 1965. He represented Norway as a B and senior international.

References

1936 births
1994 deaths
Norwegian footballers
Skeid Fotball players
Eidsvold TF players
Norway international footballers
Association football forwards